Scribe Bratko (Serbian Братко), also known as Pop Bratko, was a 13th-century Serbian Orthodox presbyter and scribe who wrote the liturgical calendar book (menaion) during the rule of Stefan Vladislav I of Serbia for feudal lord Obrad. It is the oldest menaion in Serbian literature, written in the Serbian recension of Old Church Slavonic (Old Serbian).

The menaion is composed of four parts, grouped in "services" of September and November (last fourth of the 13th century), and "festivity" for the rest of the months (first half of the 14th century). The number of Russisms and Russian orthography suggests it was made for a Russian. It was first found in the village of Banyani, near Skopje in Macedonia.

References 

Year of birth unknown
Year of death unknown
13th-century deaths
Serbian Orthodox clergy
Serbian literature
Serbian writers